is a station in Hamada, Shimane Prefecture, Japan.

Lines
West Japan Railway Company (JR West)
Sanin Main Line

Adjacent stations
West Japan Railway Company (JR West)

Railway stations in Japan opened in 1922
Railway stations in Shimane Prefecture
Sanin Main Line